Ian Boyd may refer to:

 Ian Boyd (athlete) (born 1933), British middle-distance runner
 Ian L. Boyd (born 1957), Scottish zoologist and Chief Scientific Adviser at Defra
 Ian Boyd (academic), North American scholar of literature and religion